Wasim, Wassim or Waseem
() is a masculine Arabic given name and surname meaning Handsome, Graceful or Good Looking.

People
Abbas Wasim Efendi, Ottoman astronomer 
Abdul Waseem, Pakistani politician
Ahmed Waseem Razeek, German footballer
Imad Wasim, British-Pakistani cricketer
Mohammad Wasim, Pakistani cricketer
Muhammad Waseem, Pakistani boxer
Saira Wasim, Pakistani artist
Syed Waseem Hussain, Pakistani politician
Waseem Abbas, Pakistani actor
Waseem Ahmad, Pakistani hockey player
Waseem Akhtar, Pakistani politician
Waseem Al-Bzour, Jordanian football player
Waseem Badami, Pakistani journalist
Waseem Bhatti, French cricketer
Waseem Mirza, British radio and television reporter and presenter
Waseem Shaikh, South African actor
Wasim (Guantanamo captive 338), Saudi detainee
Wasim Akram, Pakistani cricketer
Wasim Barelvi, Indian Urdu poet
Wasim Bari, Pakistani cricketer
Wasim Feroze, Indian footballer
Wasim Haider, Pakistani cricketer
Wasim Jaffer, Indian cricketer
Wasim Jafri, Pakistani Gastroenterologist
Wasim Khan, English cricketer
Wasim Raja, Pakistani cricketer
Wasim Sajjad, Pakistani politician
Wassim Almawi, Lebanese-American biochemist
Wassim Doureihi, Australian Muslim religious activist
Wassim El Banna, Danish-Palestinian footballer
Wassim Helal, Tunisian handball goalkeeper
Wassim Michael Haddad, Lebanese-Greek-American mathematician
Wassim Rezgui, Tunisian footballer
Wasim_(actor), Bangladeshi Film Actor
 Muhammad Waseem, Pakistani

Others

Indian masculine given names